Yinghuangia catbensis is a bacterium species from the genus Yinghuangia which has been isolated from soil from the Cat Ba Island in Vietnam.

References

Further reading 
 

Streptomycineae
Bacteria described in 2014